Kikojty  is a village in the administrative district of Gmina Stare Pole, within Malbork County, Pomeranian Voivodeship, in northern Poland. 

The village has a population of 34.

References

Kikojty